Ytterbium-doped Lutetium orthovanadate, typically abbreviated Yb:LuVO4, is an active laser medium.  The peak absorption cross section for the pi-polarization is 8.42×10−20 cm² at 985 nm, and the stimulated emission cross section at 1020 nm is 1.03×10−20 cm².

See also
List of laser types

Further reading
 
 

Laser gain media
Crystals
Ytterbium compounds
Lutetium compounds
Vanadates